Petr Štochl (born 24 April 1976) is a Czech handball player for Füchse Berlin and the Czech national team.

References

1976 births
Living people
Czech male handball players
Sportspeople from Plzeň